The 2013–14 season is the 23rd edition of Europe's premier basketball tournament for women – EuroLeague Women since it was rebranded to its current format.

Regular season

Group B

Round 2

Final eight

Quarter-final round

Group A

Semi-final round

Semifinal

Final

External links
  FIBA Europe website
  EuroLeague Women official website

References

Fenerbahçe Basketball